Helen Grant (born 1964 in Westminster, London) is an English author of novels for young adults, now based in Crieff, Scotland. She is a 2011 recipient of the Alex Awards.

Biography
She was educated at Dr Challoner's High School and went on to read classics at St Hugh's College, Oxford.

Her first novel, The Vanishing of Katharina Linden, was published by Penguin Books in April 2009. It was shortlisted for the Booktrust Teenage Prize and the CILIP Carnegie Medal. Laura Wilson, writing for The Guardian, called it "an eerily subtle literary page-turner" that doesn't contain anything "remotely winsome or mawkish". The Independent'''s Barry Forshaw praised the books ability to shift perceptions from the teenager protagonist's pursuit of mystical answers to adult's skepticism. Grant states that the book was inspired by the legends of the German town in which she spent time while growing up. The book has also been published in Germany as Die Mädchen des Todes, and has been published in Spain, Holland and the US.

Her second novel, The Glass Demon, published by Penguin in May 2010, combines a story of dysfunctional family with horror and history. Lisa O'Kelly of The Observer called it an "atmospheric" novel with a "chilling mood" that was reminiscent of the stories of the Brothers Grimm.

In addition to her novels for young adults, she is a regular contributor to the M.R. James Ghosts & Scholars Newsletter. Her short fiction and non fiction have been published in Supernatural Tales, All Hallows and by the Ash Tree Press. She has also provided a new translation of E.T.A. Hoffmann's Das Öde Haus in The Sandman & Other Night Pieces (Tartarus Press). Her book of uncanny short stories, The Sea Change & Other Stories'', was published by Swan River Press in 2013.

References

1964 births
Living people
People from Westminster
Alumni of St Hugh's College, Oxford
21st-century English novelists
People educated at Dr Challoner's High School